Tabitabi + Every Best Single 2: MORE COMPLETE is the twelfth studio album and second singles compilation album by Japanese music duo Every Little Thing. It was released on September 23, 2015 by Avex Trax. It reached number four on the Oricon weekly charts, and number three on the Billboard Japan Top Albums Sales.

Release 
This album was released in 5 versions.
 Original album(CD)
 Original+Best album(2CDs)
 Original+Best album(2CDs+DVD)
 Original+Best album(2CDs+Blu-ray)
 Original+Best album(2CDs+DVD+Blu-ray) with photobooks

Track listing

Tabitabi

Every Best Single 2: More Complete

Charts

References

Further reading
 
 
 
 
 

2015 albums
J-pop compilation albums